Lovestation are a British electronic dance music group formed by Vicky Aspinall in 1989, who subsequently worked with co-producer David Morgan. Gospel singer-songwriter Lisa Hunt has also appeared on several Lovestation records. Active throughout the 1990s, they released their sole debut album, Soulsation in 2000, containing '90s hits such as "Love Come Rescue Me", "Shine on Me" and "Best of My Love". They are best known for their cover of Womack & Womack's "Teardrops", which reached No. 14 on the UK Singles Chart.

History
In 1992, Aspinall and Morgan founded the independent dance label Fresh Records (no relation to the post-punk label of the same name), initially for their own Lovestation releases. The releases "Shine on Me" and "Best of My Love"  were very popular in the clubs. Lovestation caught the music industry's attention in 1995 with their house classic "Love Come Rescue Me". Originally released in 1992, a re-release two years later in 1994 gave the song a moderate charting of #42 on the UK Singles Chart in early 1995. It wasn't till 1998 when the group had major success with a UK garage cover of Womack & Womack's 1988 hit "Teardrops" which reached #14 in the UK. Another single from 1998, "Sensuality", also made the UK top 20, peaking at #16.

Discography

Studio albums

Singles

References

External links 

 

English house music duos
Electronic dance music duos
UK garage duos
Male–female musical duos